Sportovní klub Kladno, commonly known as SK Kladno or Kladno, is a football club from Kladno, Czech Republic. It was founded on February 15, 1903. The team plays at the Stadion Františka Kloze, named after legendary player of this club František Kloz. The club has spent most of its history in the top division, although it currently competes in the amateur Czech Fourth Division.

History
On February 15, 1903, a group of young men sitting in the former "U Českého dvora" Hotel in Kladno decided to establish their own sports club, at which they "cultivated" the new game of the time – football. On that day, the chapters of the rich history of Kladno football began to be written.
The first team played under the name of the Kladno Sports Club (Sportovní klub Kladno) in 1905. It soon achieved a strong position among the Czech rural teams and also achieved good results in matches with the high quality Prague clubs. The first championship encounter took place in Kladno as early as 1908 when AFK Kolín was defeated to the tune of 5–1.
The Kladno team played continually in the highest football competition between 1925 and 1947 before being expelled from the league in the 1946/47 season for the manipulation of results. The club later returned to the top flight several times, specifically in 1948–49, 1952–58 and 1960–65. The club's last premier league season for almost four decades was in 1969–70. The waiting for promotion to the top flight was until 2006.
In the statistics for the highest Czechoslovak club competition (1925–1993) SK Kladno ranks 8th among the Czech clubs. The club played a total of 618 matches, acquired 558 points and had a goal difference of 1189–1398 in the highest league competition.
Ever since 1907 when Slovan Wien left Kladno with a 1–8 defeat, Kladno has maintained international sports relations. As early as 1908, the well-known English team Crystal Palace F.C. played in Kladno and over the years SK Kladno has encountered teams from 34 countries in four continents (Europe, Asia, Africa and America). The most frequent international opponents have been European teams, in particular those from Norway, France, Germany and Austria. Throughout the period of its existence, SK Kladno has also participated in a number of significant football tournaments. These have included the popular Central European Cup (1934, 1938, 1961), the Rappan Cup 1964 and the city competition in Belgium (Brussels 1931 and Liege 1932 and 1938). In 1934, the Kladno team undertook its longest ever international trip to the USA, which proved to be good promotion not only for Czechoslovakia, but also European football.
A number of important footballers began their football in the blue and white of Kladno or wore it at some time during their careers. Among them were Otakar Škvain-Mazal (1894–1941), a pupil of SK Kladno and the author of three goals at the Antwerp Olympics in 1920 where the Czechoslovak national team made it to the final. František Kloz (1905–1945), Kladno's most popular player and most active goal scorer (592 goals in Kladno colours) and a Czechoslovak international player who, like his teammate, Josef Kusala, laid down his life with a gun in his hand during the liberation of his homeland in 1945. Karel Kolský (1914–1984), a player and coach of Czechoslovak national team. Jan Fábera (1928–1984), a player SK Kladno, who successfully trained the national team of Sudan and was active as a coach in Algeria and Iceland. From 1971–72, he and Jozef Vengloš trained the Czechoslovak under-23 team, which won the European Championship. Josef Kadraba (born 1933), a Kladno striker and a player and coach for Slovan Wien, but mostly a member of the Czechoslovak national team, which surprised many by achieving the silver medal at the 1962 FIFA World Cup in Chile. Jan Suchopárek (born 1969), a Kladno pupil, a player with 61 caps in the national team. In 1996, he brought back "silver" for the second place at the Euro held in England. It should also be recalled that the legendary Czech striker and long-time player at Slavia Praha, Josef Bican (1913–2001), trained the Kladno first team in the 1962–63 season.

Historical names
 1903 — SK Kladno (full name: Sportovní kroužek Kladno)
 1904 — SK Kladno (full name: Sportovní klub Kladno)
 1948 — ZSJ SONP Kladno (full name: Základní sportovní jednota Spojené ocelárny národní podnik Kladno) – merged with STAK Letná
 1949 — TJ Sokol SONP Kladno (full name: Tělovýchovná jednota Sokol Spojené ocelárny národní podnik Kladno)
 1953 — DSO Baník Kladno (full name: Dobrovolná sportovní organizace Baník Kladno)
 1958 — TJ SONP Kladno (full name: Tělovýchovná jednota Spojené ocelárny národní podnik Kladno)
 1960 — TJ Baník Kladno (full name: Tělovýchovná jednota Baník Kladno)
 1961 — TJ SONP Kladno (full name: Tělovýchovná jednota Spojené ocelárny národní podnik Kladno)
 1977 — TJ Poldi SONP Kladno (full name: Tělovýchovná jednota Poldi Spojené ocelárny národní podnik Kladno)
 1989 — TJ Poldi Kladno (full name: Tělovýchovná jednota Poldi Kladno)
 1993 — FC Terrex Kladno (full name: Football Club Terrex Kladno, a.s.)
 1994 — FC Agrox Kladno (full name: Football Club Agrox Kladno, a.s.)
 1995 — SK Kladno (full name: Sportovní klub Kladno, a.s.) – in 2003 merged with SK Spolana Neratovice

Players

Current squad

Former managers
 Miroslav Koubek
 Jaroslav Šilhavý (June 2007 – June 2008)
 Martin Hřídel (June 2008 – April 2010)
 Stanislav Procházka (April 2010 – June 2010)
 Stanislav Hejkal (June 2010 – August 2010)
 Miroslav Beránek (August 2010 – January 2011)
 Jaroslav Peřina (January 2011 – July 2011)
 Eduard Novák (July 2011 – October 2011)
 Zbyněk Busta (October 2011 – November 2011)
 Martin Čurda (November 2011 – April 2012)
 Daniel Drahokoupil (April 2012 – May 2013)

History in domestic competitions

39 seasons in First League
29 seasons in Second League
15 seasons in Third League
8 seasons in Fourth Division

Czech Republic

History in European competitions

Honours
First League
3rd Place 1933–34, 1946–47
4th Place 1927, 1937–38, 1952
5th Place 1927–28, 1928–29, 1930–31, 1932–33, 1934–35, 1936–37, 1953
Second League
champions 1925, 1947–48, 1951, 1959–60, 2005–06
runners-up (promotion) 1968–69
Czech Cup
runners-up 1975–76

References

External links
  Official website

 
Kladno, SK
Association football clubs established in 1903
Kladno, SK
Kladno, SK